Herbert Kershaw (first ¼ 1885 – February 1955), also known by the nickname of "Harry",  was an English rugby union, and professional rugby league footballer who played in the 1900s, 1910s and 1920s. He played representative level rugby union (RU) for Yorkshire, and at club level for Wakefield RFC, and representative level rugby league (RL) for Great Britain, England and Yorkshire, and at club level for Wakefield Trinity (Heritage № 154) (captain), as a forward (prior to the specialist positions of), during the era of contested scrums.

After retirement from rugby league, in 1928 Wakefield RFC employed him as a bagman and he also assisted in training, paying him 2s/6d a week, (based on increases in average earnings, this would be approximately £20.97 in 2016).

Background
Kershaw was born in Wakefield, West Riding of Yorkshire, England, he was the landlord of the Admiral Duncan Inn, Thornes Lane, Wakefield from 1914 to 1926, and the Brewers' Arms, Westgate, Wakefield , he died aged 69 in Wakefield, West Riding of Yorkshire, England, and he is buried in Thornes Parish Church of Saint James, Denby Dale Road, Wakefield, West Yorkshire, England.

Playing career

International honours
Herbert Kershaw won caps for England (RL) while at Wakefield Trinity in 1910 against Wales, in 1911 against Wales, and Australia, and won caps for Great Britain (RL) while at Wakefield Trinity on the 1910 Great Britain Lions tour of Australia and New Zealand against Australia, Australasia, and New Zealand.

County honours
Herbert Kershaw won cap(s) for Yorkshire while at Wakefield Trinity.

Challenge Cup Final appearances
Herbert Kershaw played as a forward, i.e. number 12, in Wakefield Trinity's 17–0 victory over Hull F.C. in the 1908–09 Challenge Cup Final during the 1908–09 season at Headingley Rugby Stadium, Leeds on Tuesday 20 April 1909, in front of a crowd of 23,587. and played as a forward, i.e. number 11, was captain, and five minutes after the half-time restart he was sent off for kicking in the 0-6 defeat by Hull F.C. in the 1913–14 Challenge Cup Final during the 1913–14 season at Thrum Hall, Halifax, in front of a crowd of 19,000.

County Cup Final appearances
Herbert Kershaw played as a forward, i.e. number 9, in Wakefield Trinity's 8-2 victory over Huddersfield in the 1910–11 Yorkshire County Cup Final during the 1910–11 season at Headingley Rugby Stadium, Leeds on Saturday 3 December 1910.

Notable tour matches
Herbert Kershaw played as a forward, i.e. number 13, in Wakefield Trinity's 20-13 victory over Australia in the 1908–09 Kangaroo tour of Great Britain match at Belle Vue, Wakefield on Saturday 19 December 1908.

Testimonial match
Herbert Kershaw's Testimonial match for Wakefield Trinity took place against Batley at Belle Vue, Wakefield on Saturday 12 February 1921, it was a joint Testimonial match with George Taylor.

Club career
Herbert Kershaw made his début for Wakefield Trinity during January 1906, he appears to have scored no drop-goals (or field-goals as they are currently known in Australasia), but prior to the 1974–75 season all goals, whether; conversions, penalties, or drop-goals, scored 2-points, consequently prior to this date drop-goals were often not explicitly documented, therefore '0' drop-goals may indicate drop-goals not recorded, rather than no drop-goals scored. In addition, prior to the 1949–50 season, the archaic field-goal was also still a valid means of scoring points.

Contemporaneous Article Extract
"Played his earliest football with Thornes Lane Rovers and Thornes United, then at scrum half for Wakefield R.U. he gained Yorkshire County R.U. honours. His entry into Trinity's ranks came at a time when the highly successful half-back combination of Slater and Newbould was in full swing – but he proved himself a versatile player and when, for that famous Cup semi-final against Wigan, Trinity found themselves without a loose-forward, Herbert stepped into the breach. His fast and clever play plus deadly tackling made a handsome contribution to Trinity's victory. He played at loose forward in the Challenge Cup Final v. Hull FC, and that became his settled position. Not only that, but he went on the 1910 Tour as loose-forward, and played in the Brisbane Test"

Genealogical information
Herbert Kershaw was married to Mary Hannah Kershaw (née unknown, born  – died April 1962 (aged 75) in Wakefield, West Riding of Yorkshire).

Note
According to the reference (Lindley, John (1960). Dreadnoughts – A HISTORY OF Wakefield Trinity F. C. 1873 – 1960. John Lindley Son & Co Ltd. ISBN n/a) Herbert Kershaw played number 13, in Wakefield Trinity's 17–0 victory over Hull F.C. in the 1908–09 Challenge Cup Final during the 1908–09 season, whereas other references state he played number 12, the actual position played by forwards in the early years of rugby league was less consistent than in the modern era.

References

External links

1885 births
1955 deaths
England national rugby league team players
English rugby league players
English rugby union players
Great Britain national rugby league team players
Place of death missing
Publicans
Rugby league forwards
Rugby league players from Wakefield
Rugby union players from Wakefield
Wakefield RFC players
Wakefield Trinity captains
Wakefield Trinity players
Yorkshire County RFU players
Yorkshire rugby league team players